The term speculum, Latin for "mirror", and its plural specula, may refer to:

 Speculum (journal), a journal of medieval studies published by the Medieval Academy of America
 Speculum (medical), a medical tool used for examining body cavities
 Speculum feathers, the secondary feathers on the inner part of a duck's wing which are often brightly coloured
 Speculum literature, a medieval genre
 Speculum metal, an alloy containing copper and tin used for making all-metal mirrors
 "Speculum", a song by Adema from Adema (album)

See also

Specula (disambiguation)
Spiculum, a Roman weapon